Joseph Modeste Sweeney (September 6, 1920 – December 11, 2000) was the 16th dean of the Tulane University Law School, serving from 1968 to 1977.  He graduated from Harvard Law School in 1948 and began a career specializing in international law.

References

Tulane University faculty
Tulane University Law School faculty
Deans of Tulane University Law School
Deans of law schools in the United States
1920 births
2000 deaths
Harvard Law School alumni
20th-century American lawyers
20th-century American academics